The Palau nautilus, Nautilus belauensis, is mainly found in Palau in the Western Carolines as its name suggests. It can be found on fore reef slopes in depths ranging from 95m to 504m but typically prefers to remain within 150-300m where water temperatures range between 16.6 to 9.4ºC. N. belauensis are highly mobile epibenthic scavenging herbalist and opportunistic predators that rely mostly on scent detection. They are active both diurnally and nocturnally within the preferred depth range although most shallow-water-incursions are usually nocturnal events that coincide with greatly diminished fish activities.

Anatomy 
N. belauensis’ shell is similar to that of N. pompilius, but it is distinguished by its larger mean mature shell diameter and shell weight. Its shell characteristic pattern consists of bifurcating brown to red stripes that extend from the umbilicus to the venter without coalescing across the venter with delicate, longitudinally crenulated ridges that produce a distinctive, concentrically lirate pattern. It can also be distinguished from N. pompilius by its inwardly sloping umbilical walls and evenly rounded umbilical shoulder. The shell is also distinguishable by the presence of longitudinally crenulated shell sculpture, and a broadly triangular central rachidian radular tooth and a lack of umbilical callus. Fresh shells were also found to implode at 680-789m depth equivalent pressures.

Development 
At the immature/juvenile stage the Palau nautilus’ shell is covered in colored bands. Its body chamber is covered by a thick, gelatinous, and slippery periostracum. As it reaches the sub mature stage, most of its body chamber is white but with thin margins. However, it still lacks a black layer that develops upon maturity.

Maturity in the Palau nautilus is reached when there is a rapid decrease in growth rate until there is no additional growth. The body chamber shell wall thickens with deposition of a black layer along the apertural margin and the accentuation of the hyponomic and ocular sinuses. The exterior body chamber lacks colour banding. The last septum is thickened but has a reduced volume in the final chamber. There are usually around 35 septa in the shell. The maximum observed range in shell sizes extends from 180mm to 239mm in diameter with the umbilical diameter taking up 16% of the shell diameter. The Palau nautilus can live for 5-10 years after reaching maturity and have a life span that may range beyond 20 years.

Behaviour 
The Palau nautilus is able to traverse across a wide range of temperatures and great lateral distances in short periods of time. It is also able to survive in warm water up to 30ºC for tens of hours up to several days. It typically migrates from deeper water into shallower water following sunset and returns to the deep before sunlight. It is also able to travel an average distance from 0.45km per day over 322 days up to 0.8km per day over 5 days.

Gallery

References

External links

Nautiluses
Molluscs described in 1981